Surjapuri is an Eastern Indo-Aryan language  is an eastern Indo-Aryan language of the Bengali-Assamese branch, spoken in Eastern India including North Bengal, West Bengal, and Banganchal of Eastern Bihar (Purnia Division), as well as Jhapa District in Nepal,  Goalpara Division of Assam in India and Rangpur Division in Bangladesh. Among speakers in some regions, it is known as 'Deshi Bhasa'. It possesses similarities with Kamatapuri, Assamese, Bengali, and Maithili.

Geographical distribution
Surjapuri is mainly spoken of Surjapuri Bengali in the parts of Purnia division (Kishanganj, Katihar, Purnia, and Araria districts) of Bihar. It is also spoken in West Bengal (Uttar Dinajpur and Dakshin Dinajpur districts, and in North Malda of Malda district, specially in Harishchandrapur and Chanchal area and Siliguri city of Darjeeling district – part of the North Bengal region within the Jalpaiguri division), Bangladesh (Thakurgaon District) as well as in parts of eastern Nepal.

Related languages
Surjapuri is associated with the Kamtapuri language (and its dialects Rangpuri and Koch Rajbangshi) spoken in North Bengal and Western Assam, as well as with Assamese, Bengali, and Maithili.

Pronouns

Surjapuri has the oblique plural suffixes: sā (hamsā-, tomsā-) and smā (ismā-, usmā-). They are also seen in Early Assamese as: sā (āmāsā-, tomāsā-) and sambā (esambā-, tesambā-) and their occurrences are similar.

Phonology

Consonants

Vowels 

 Nasalization is also phonemic.
 /i, e/ in medial and initial form are heard as [ɪ, ɛ].

Notes

References

Further reading
 Srivastava, S.P. and Perumalsamy, P (2021). Linguistic Description of Surjapuri Mother Tongue Spoken in Bihar, New Delhi: Office of the Registrar General.

External links
 Free repository of illustrated children's stories in Surjapuri translated by Azad India Foundation and sponsored by Pratham Books
 
 
 
 A Sketch Grammar (2021) of Surjapuri mother tongue spoken in Bihar state

Indo-Aryan languages